"Smoky Places" is a song written by Abner Spector and performed by The Corsairs.  It reached #10 on the U.S. R&B chart and #12 on the U.S. pop chart in 1962.

The song was arranged by Sammy Lowe and produced by Abner Spector.

The song ranked #51 on Billboard magazine's Top 100 singles of 1962.

Other charting versions
Billy Walker released a version of the song as a single in 1969 which reached #12 on the U.S. country chart.

Other versions
Billy Swan released a version of the song on his 1977 album Four.
Bob Regan released a version of the song as a single in 1983, but it did not chart.
Charlie McCoy released a version of the song on his 1991 album Out on a Limb.
Ronnie McDowell featuring Bill Pinkney's Original Drifters released a version of the song on his 2002 album Ronnie McDowell with Bill Pinkney's Original Drifters.

In popular culture
The song was featured in the 1994 film There Goes My Baby.
The song was featured in the 2006 Sopranos' episode "Mayham".

References

1961 songs
1961 singles
1969 singles
1983 singles
Billy Walker (musician) songs
Billy Swan songs
Charlie McCoy songs
Ronnie McDowell songs
Curb Records singles